Mathias Raymond (born 13 January 1986 in La Colle, Monaco) is a Monégasque Olympic rower. He competed in the 2008, and the 2012 Summer Olympics. At the 2008 Summer Olympics he was Monaco's flag bearer during the Opening Ceremony.

References 

Monegasque male rowers
People from La Colle, Monaco
Rowers at the 2008 Summer Olympics
1986 births
Rowers at the 2012 Summer Olympics
Olympic rowers of Monaco
Competitors at the 2005 Mediterranean Games
Competitors at the 2013 Mediterranean Games
Living people
Mediterranean Games competitors for Monaco